is a district located in Oshima Subprefecture, Hokkaido, Japan.

As of 2004, the district has an estimated population of 39,166 and a density of 111.43 persons per km2. The total area is 351.49 km2 (136 miles²).

Towns
Nanae

Merger
On December 1, 2004, the towns of Esan and Toi, and the village of Todohokke merged into the expanded city of Hakodate.
On February 1, 2006, the town of Ōno merged with the town of Kamiiso, from Kamiiso District, to form the new city of Hokuto.

Districts in Hokkaido